Mutaga IV Mbikije ( – 30 November 1915) was the king of Burundi from 21 August 1908 until 30 November 1915. He was the son of Mwami Mwezi IV. 
He inherited the throne at the age of 15, after his father died in 1908, under the regnal name of Mutaga. Being too young to ensure continuity, he ruled with the help of a regency council consisting of another wife of his father, Ririkumutima, and a half-brother of this father, Ntanigera. Mutaga IV died prematurely in November 1915 after a fight that supposedly pitted him against his younger brother, Prince Bangura.

He had two sons:

 Mwambutsa IV of Burundi.
 Prince Ignace Kamatari (died 1964), father of Princess Esther Kamatari

His stepmother, Ririkumutima, served as regent for much of his reign.

References

External links
The King's picture
Genealogy of Mutaga IV

1915 deaths
Burundian kings
Year of birth uncertain
1890s births